Turnagain, also called Buru Island, is an island of the Western Islands region of the Torres Strait Islands archipelago, located in the northern section of Torres Strait, Queensland, Australia. Turnagain is located within the Torres Strait Island Region Local government area.

Geography
It is uninhabited and is the shape of an elongated teardrop.

See also

List of Torres Strait Islands

References

External links
 DFAT website
 Australian Treaty Series 1985 No 4

Torres Strait Islands
Torres Strait Island Region